Some people who were elected to the United States House of Representatives died before taking their seats. In other cases, they failed to qualify; were rejected by the House; their credentials were successfully challenged; or they were somehow otherwise unable to become members.

This list only includes people who never served in the House. Re-elected incumbents are not included.

List

See also
 Unseated members of the United States Congress

References

Unseated